Ocklochnee may refer to:

 Ochlocknee, Georgia
 Ochlockonee River, in Georgia and Florida
 Ochlockonee River State Park